Horacio Badaraco (1901–1946) was an Argentine anarchist and journalist, born in Buenos Aires.

1901 births
1946 deaths
Argentine anarchists
People from Buenos Aires